Erica Blinn is an American Rock artist based out of Nashville, TN. She is originally from Worthington, Ohio, a suburb of Columbus, OH. She learned everything about guitar and harmonica from her dad, Jerry. She started playing the harmonica when she was only 14 and started playing the bars then too. The harmonica turned into a guitar, and soon enough she was singing to the sound of her guitar. Erica Blinn played in numerous bands in high school, and in college too.

Discovery 
She met Colin Gawel after finding him after one of his concerts. She and Gawel began practicing together. Colin Gawel helped Blinn launch her solo career just a few years ago. Her most recent album was produced with Mike Landolt (famous from producing Maroon 5, Blues Traveler, OAR) . She practices with guitar player, Andy Harrison, as well.

Now 
The music Erica Blinn plays is from the heart. It has a Midwestern, American rock feel to it . Her upbeat harmonic tune stretches to the hearts of those who listen. She sings out honest words that stretch and twist through her tunes. Blinn bends the rules of the blues, and continuously knocks down the walls of pop music, creating a blue-collar music that everyone can stand up for and dance to. Blinn records at the Curry House Records in Nashville, TN. She and the members of her team (listed below) strive to produce a harmonic sound through guitar and Blinn's voice.

Members 
Erica Blinn - Guitarist, Vocalist; PJ Schreiner - Backup Vocalist, Drummer; Will Newsome - Guitarist; Andrew Leahey - Backup Vocalist, Guitarist.

With many tours planned, she has played over 150 shows in the last year, and will to put on shows in Ohio, Indiana, Pennsylvania and Kentucky. Some of the sites she has played at include: Liveburgh Studio, The Ohio State Fair, Wisteria Autumn Fires Festival, Rumba Cafe, and more.

Some acts who have taken part in the event are: Rob McNelly (son of original lead singer Bobby Gene McNelly and current guitarist for Bob Seger and The Silver Bullet Band), John David Call (steel guitarist for Pure Prairie League), Steve Smith, Gary Ballen, Delyn Christian, Tom Ingham,  the Dan Orr Project, Cliff Cody, Grassanine and McGuffey Lane.

References 

Year of birth missing (living people)
Living people
American women rock singers
American rock guitarists
21st-century American women